Dendrobium maidenianum, commonly known as the coastal burr orchid, is an epiphytic or lithophytic orchid in the family Orchidaceae and is endemic to tropical North Queensland, Australia. It has a single thin, dark green leaf on a thin stem and one or two small white flowers that self-pollinate. It grows on trees and rocks in shady rainforest.

Description 
Dendrobium maidenianum is an epiphytic or lithophytic herb that usually forms small clumps. Flowering occurs between January and July but the flowers are short-lived and self-pollinated.

Taxonomy and naming
Dendrobium maidenianum was first formally described in 1905 by Rudolf Schlechter in Schumann and Lauterbach's book Nachträge zur Flora der deutschen Schutzgebiete in der Südsee. Schlechter noted that the forms of Dendrobium hispidum from northern Australia are different from those of Vanikoro in having "small white or female flowers" and gave them the name D. maidenianum in honor of the director of the Botanic Garden in Sydney, who at that time was Joseph Maiden.
The World Checklist of Selected Plant Families gives the year of description as 1912, referring to Repertorium specierum novarum regni vegetabilis. Beihefte., but in that journal, published in 1914, Schlechter refers to the 1905 publication.

Distribution and habitat
The coastal burr orchid is endemic to tropical North Queensland, Australia.

References

maidenianum
Orchids of Queensland
Plants described in 1905